Nyhavn 23 is a Neoclassical property overlooking the Nyhavn Canal in central Copenhagen, Denmark. It was listed in the Danish registry of protected buildings and places in 1918. A plaque on the facade commemorates the composer Friedrich Kuhlau, who resided there in 1832.

History

18th century

In the late 17th century, Nyhavn 1727 was one large property. It was by 1689 as No. 9 in St. Ann's East Quarter (Sankt Annæ Øster Kvarter) owned by stone mason Hans Friedrich. Present-day Nyhavn 23 was by 1756 as No. 12 owned by beer merchant  Niels Jensen.

The property was later acquired by skipper Mads Tommen. At the time of the 1787 census, he lived there with his wife Elisabeth Klaus Datter, their two children (aged seven and 15), a maid and a lodger.

Olsen family and the new building
The present building on the site was built in 1803 for skipper Realf Olsen Schaarbech. He operated a tavern in the ground floor.

The property was again listed as No. 12 in the new cadastre of 1806. It was at that time owned by Rufolf Olsen.

The composer Frederik Kuhlau lived in the building until his death in 1832.

1834 census
No. 12 was home to five households at the 1834 census. Ane Catrine Koefoed, a 54-year-old widow and the owner of the property, resided on the second floor with her six children (aged 18 to 30). The three sons were all at sea when the census took place. Her late husband Hans Isaac Poulsen Kofoed (1775-1822) had been a ship captain and merchant.  Peter Georg Gynther, a 1st secretary in the Lord Chamberlain's Office, resided on the third floor with his wife Charlotte Amalie Lundell and one maid.  Johan Hendrik Davn Kramer, a rye break baker and flour retailer, resided on the ground floor with his Dorthea Chatrine Kramer, their eight-year-old daughter  Dorthea Chatrine Kramer and one maid. Antonette Fichsjer, a 68-year-old spinster, resided on the first floor with the ship captain Nels F.Volf (then at sea), Volf's five-year-old son Johan Anton Volff, the lady's companion Jensine Lange	and the maid Ane Wold. Berte Sofie Glaser, 67-year-old widow supported by a "grant from Kofoed", resided on the fourth floor with three unmarried children (aged 22 to 30) and a 23-year old seamstress.

1850s
The editor and writer Erik Bøgh was a resident of the building from 
1851 to 1854. He had created the first Danish revue at the nearby Casino Theatre in 1857.

1860 census
The property was home to 20 residents in five households at the 1860 census. Mathias Secher, a medical doctor, resided in the building with his wife Juliane Marie Secher, their six-year-old son Viliam Secher and one maid. Trine Jørgensen, a widow, resided in another apart,emt. Jens Peter Gammelgaard, a skipper, resided in a third apartment with his wife Josephine Gammelgaard, their two children (aged 10 and 12) and one maid. Johan Frederik Valdemar Møller, a master painter, resided in the building with his wife Ludovika Møller, their two-year-old son Luis Oskar Møller, one maid and two apprentices. Anders Nielsen, a barkeeper, resided in the building with his wife Ane Christine Nielsen and the wife's father Jens Hansen.

Architecture

The building is four storeys tall and four bays wide. Above the door is a stone plate from 1804 featuring a beer jug. A side wing extends from the rear side of the building.

Today
Testaurant Gasten is based in the ground floor and the basement is home to the café Galionen.

References

External links

 Source

Listed residential buildings in Copenhagen
Houses completed in 1803